Visa requirements for Dominican Republic citizens are administrative entry restrictions by the authorities of other states placed on citizens of the Dominican Republic. Along with Cuba and Haiti, the Dominican Republic passport is considered the weakest passport in Latin America for traveling.

Dominican Republic citizens are among only few Latin American nations, such as Bolivia and Ecuador, that still do not enjoy visa free regime with the European Union.

As of 23  January 2023, holders of a Dominican Republic passport could travel to only 70 countries and territories without a travel visa or with a visa on arrival, ranking the Dominican Republic passport 73th ( tied with Zambia), in terms of travel freedom, according to the Henley Passport Index,

Visa requirements map

Visa requirements

Dependent, Disputed, or Restricted territories
Visa requirements for Dominican Republic citizens for visits to various territories, disputed areas, partially recognised countries and restricted zones:

Non-visa restrictions

See also

 Visa policy of the Dominican Republic
 Dominican Republic passport

References and Notes
References

Notes

Dominican Republic
Foreign relations of the Dominican Republic